The University of Mississippi Power House was located on the campus of the University of Mississippi in Oxford, Mississippi. The original building was constructed in 1908 as a central power plant for the entire campus.

Author William Faulkner was employed by the University of Mississippi in the Power House through the winter of 1929 as a night supervisor. At that time, the plant would supply power during the night for both the University of Mississippi and the town of Oxford, Mississippi. The low power demand during the evening and the redundancy of the supervisory position offered Faulkner time to write, which he did using the back of a wheelbarrow. The resulting work was published in 1930 as As I Lay Dying. 

The University of Mississippi Power House was demolished by the University in the spring of 2016. The University of Mississippi plans to construct a commemorative space near the same location using a $5 million donation from the Gertrude C. Ford Foundation.

Gallery

References

William Faulkner
Infrastructure completed in 1908
Buildings and structures at the University of Mississippi
1908 establishments in Mississippi
2016 disestablishments in Mississippi
Demolished buildings and structures in Mississippi
Buildings and structures demolished in 2016
Former power stations in Mississippi